Fonti Flora Plantation is a historic plantation house located near Monticello, Fairfield County, South Carolina.  It was built about 1836, and is a 2-½ story clapboard residence set on low foundations. The front façade features a full width two-story Greek Revival portico supported by six square paneled piers.  Additional decorative detail includes the Gothic Revival style tripartite Gothic windows on the front and side facades.

It was added to the National Register of Historic Places in 1979.

References

Plantation houses in South Carolina
Houses on the National Register of Historic Places in South Carolina
Gothic Revival architecture in South Carolina
Greek Revival houses in South Carolina
Houses completed in 1836
Houses in Fairfield County, South Carolina
National Register of Historic Places in Fairfield County, South Carolina